The derivative of a function is the rate of change of the function's output relative to its input value.

Derivative may also refer to:

In mathematics and economics
Brzozowski derivative in the theory of formal languages
Formal derivative, an operation on elements of a polynomial ring which mimics the form of the derivative from calculus
Radon–Nikodym derivative in measure theory
Derivative (set theory), a concept applicable to normal functions
Derivative (graph theory), an alternative term for a line graph deva
Derivative (finance), a contract whose value is derived from that of other quantities
Derivative suit or derivative action, a type of lawsuit filed by shareholders of a corporation

In science and engineering
Derivative (chemistry), a type of compound which is a product of the process of derivatization
Derivative (linguistics), the process of forming a new word on the basis of an existing word, e.g. happiness and unhappy from happy
Aeroderivative gas turbine, a mechanical drive gas turbine derived from an aero engine gas turbine

Other uses
Derivative work, in copyright law, a modification of an original work
 Fork (software development)
Derivative (film), a 2005 Turkish film
Derivative Inc., a spin-off of Side Effects Software, creators of the software Houdini

See also
Derive (disambiguation), for meanings of "derive" and "derived"
Derivation (disambiguation)
Imitation
Interpretation (disambiguation)
Mimicry